The 2022–23 WE League, also known as the 2022–23 Yogibo WE League (Japanese: 2022–23 Yogibo WEリーグ, Hepburn: 2022–23 Yogibo WE Rīgu) for sponsorship reasons, is the 2nd season of the WE League, the top Japanese women's professional league for association football clubs, since its establishment in 2020. The league began on 22 October 2022 and will end on 11 June 2023.

Teams

Personnel and kits

League table

Results

Season statistics

Top scorers

Matches
List of matches that were played, or are yet to be played on the 2022–23 WE League season. With an even number of teams (11) competing in the league, there are five matches to play each matchweek, with the team who doesn't have any fixture on the matchweek earning a "standby round", called as the "WE League WE Action Day". All the matches and fixtures displayed here can be found at the Official WE League Website. All the kick-off times are listed in (UTC+9), Japan Standard Time (JST).

Matchweek 1

Matchweek 2

Matchweek 3

Matchweek 4

Matchweek 5

Matchweek 6

Matchweek 7

Matchweek 8

Matchweek 9

Matchweek 10

Matchweek 11

Broadcasting rights
In Japan, there is live streaming on DAZN. Globally, some matches are streamed in the WE League's own YouTube channel.

See also
 Japan Football Association (JFA)
 2023 in Japanese football
 2023 Nadeshiko League
 2023 Empress's Cup
 2022–23 WE League Cup

References

External links
Official website 
WE League data site 

Japan
1
L
1
L
Japan